Nubanusit Brook is a  stream in southern New Hampshire in the United States. The brook begins at the outlet of Nubanusit Lake in Nelson. It is a tributary of the Contoocook River, part of the Merrimack River watershed. The brook flows south into Harrisville, interrupted by Harrisville Pond and Skatutakee Lake, then east to the MacDowell Reservoir (constructed for flood control) in Peterborough. The brook turns south, passes the village of West Peterborough, and reaches the Contoocook River after passing through Peterborough village.

Nubanusit Brook was important to the establishment and development of Harrisville and Peterborough because many dams were built along it to provide water power to mills. These included substantial textile mills in Harrisville, West Peterborough, and Peterborough, as well as smaller mills along the brook's course.

See also

List of rivers of New Hampshire

References 

 New Hampshire GRANIT geographic information system: 1:25,000-scale digital hydrographic data derived from U.S. Geological Survey topographic maps

Tributaries of the Merrimack River
Rivers of New Hampshire
Rivers of Cheshire County, New Hampshire
Rivers of Hillsborough County, New Hampshire